Plainfield Community School Corporation (PCSC) is a school district headquartered in Plainfield, Indiana.

Schools
Secondary:
 Plainfield High School
 Plainfield Community Middle School
Elementary:
 Brentwood Elementary
 Central Elementary
 Clarks Creek Elementary
 Van Buren Elementary

Preschool:
 Little Quakers Academy Preschool

References

External links
 Plainfield Community School Corporation

School districts in Indiana
Education in Hendricks County, Indiana